"Freebird", or "Free Bird", is a 1974 song by Lynyrd Skynyrd.

Freebird may also refer to:

Freebird (2008 film), a British comedy film by Jon Ivay
Freebird (2021 film), a Canadian 2D animated short film
Freebird, 1999 play by Jon Ivay, the source for the film
Free Bird Innovations, an American aircraft manufacturer
Freebird I, an American single-seat kit aircraft
Freebird II, an American two-seat kit aircraft
Freebird Airlines, Turkish holiday charter airline
Freebird Records, Dutch independent record label
Dorna Free Bird, an Iranian light-sport aircraft

See also
Freebirds (disambiguation)